Furr, released in 2008, is the fourth album by Blitzen Trapper.  The album was listed at #13 on Rolling Stones 50 Best Albums of 2008, and the title track made #4 on Rolling Stones 100 Best Singles of 2008. Music videos were made for the album's two singles, "Furr" and "Black River Killer".

Robin Pecknold of the band Fleet Foxes responded to the track, "Lady On the Water" enthusiastically: "it's a beautiful and woozy folk song. Eric Earley is a supergenius and it's so wonderful to hear folk music that's not just 'folk' because of the quaint acoustic instruments as is sometimes the case these days.  I think a proper folk song needs to be instructive and entertaining, in the sense that the melody has its own captivating logic, I think a good folk song is like a machine, all elements perfectly calibrated, and this song is the Large Hadron Collider, smashing things together to get to the bottom of the universe."

Track listing
All songs written by Eric Earley

Critical reception

Critical response to the album was overwhelmingly favorable.  Rolling Stone gave Furr four-out-of-five stars and called it "an engaging album full of rootsy beauty."  Billboard found it to be "a perfect fall soundtrack rife with woodsy imagery."  Entertainment Weekly, in an article recommending what to exchange unwanted Christmas gifts for, said the album was "part harmony-laden tambourine jangle, part British Invasion guitar charm, and fully worth braving brutal return lines at the mall."

References

2008 albums